Chris Tate is a fictional character from the British ITV soap opera Emmerdale, played by Peter Amory. The character made his first appearance on 14 November 1989, when he arrived in the village alongside the rest of the Tate family – his father Frank (Norman Bowler); stepmother Kim (Claire King); and younger sister Zoe (Leah Bracknell).

Initially a decent man, Chris was left permanently resentful of his life after a plane crash in 1993 left him paralysed from the waist down. His storylines on the show included his numerous feuds, including one with his father Frank; a longstanding rivalry with his stepmother Kim; and his marriages with local villager Kathy Merrick (Malandra Burrows), her best-friend Rachel Hughes (Glenda McKay), and scheming ex-prostitute Charity Dingle (Emma Atkins). Towards the end of his story arc, Chris learned that he had an inoperable brain tumour and used this opportunity to get revenge on Charity for cheating on him with her cousin Cain Dingle (Jeff Hordley). After wasting all of his money to ensure that Charity would be left with nothing, Chris committed suicide to frame her for his "murder" – with the character making his final appearance on 18 September 2003 as a corpse following his death an episode earlier.

Characterisation
 Chris was initially portrayed as a decent man, but was left permanently resentful of his life after a plane crash in 1993 left him paralyzed from the waist down. The character then became much more jaded and bitter, often using his intelligence and assets to exact revenge on those he perceived to have hurt him. Radio Times described Chris as a "wealthy bad boy" and "one of the most complex, conniving characters in Emmerdale history."

Storylines
Chris Tate first arrived at Emmerdale in November 1989 when his father Frank (Norman Bowler) and stepmother Kim bought Home Farm. He was the managing director of his father's haulage firm. He had owned a flat in Skipdale, but moved into Home Farm soon afterwards to be closer to love interest Kathy Merrick (Malandra Burrows). It quickly becomes clear that Chris has a tense relationship with father, partly due to the death of Chris's mother Jean following her death from cancer five years ago. Another reason is because of Frank's remarriage to his secretary Kim, who was only a few years older than Chris and had been having an affair with Frank whilst Jean was ill. Despite the turbulence between father and son, Chris was close to his younger sister Zoe. When Frank admitted he had helped Jean die when she was terminally ill, Chris initially accused Frank and Kim of plotting his mother's death. Chris was also unimpressed when Kim persuaded Frank to have an operation to reverse his vasectomy.

Chris and Kathy eventually began dating and Chris wrote a song for Kathy to sing at a village concert, 'Just This Side of Love' (which was released as a single sung by Malandra Burrows). They briefly split up over Chris's gambling habits after he lost his motorbike in a poker match to Alan Turner (Richard Thorp), but reunite and marry on 5 November 1991. The marriage began to break down a year later when Chris found out Kathy knew that Kim was having an affair with village toff Rt. Hon. Neil Kincaid (Brian Deacon). In the row that follows, Chris nearly hit Kathy and later confides in Zoe that he is worried that he has inherited their father's temper. Chris also admitted that although he wanted children, Kathy didn't. When Frank relapses into his old alcoholism to the point where he starts drinking again, Chris sees an opportunity to gain control of the business by buying Kim's shares. His plan to do so involves mortgaging his and Kathy's cottage to do so. Kathy soon finds out about this when Frank discovers what his son has done and accuses Kathy of conspiring with Chris against him. To Chris' surprise, however, Zoe joined forces with Frank to vote down Chris. Kathy, unhappy with his actions, begins an affair with American wine merchant Josh Lewis (Peter Warnock), and plans to leave Chris by the end on 1993.

On 30 December 1993, Chris spent the evening in Skipdale with a friend – unaware Kathy was planning to leave him that night. He was supposed to pick up Kathy and meet Zoe in the Woolpack, but went straight to the pub and was there when a plane crashed into the village. Chris was trapped in the wreckage of the wine bar, with his family thinking he was still in Skipdale. He was eventually discovered by Josh, and was dug out overnight. He had spinal injuries and was left paraplegic.

Chris was very bitter about being disabled and realized that Kathy was only with him out of duty. He formed a bond with her best-friend-Rachel Hughes (Glenda McKay), whose brother, Mark, died in the plane crash and she began giving him swimming lessons. The friendship became an affair and Kathy found out when she saw them kissing on their third wedding anniversary. When Kathy found out Rachel was expecting Chris's child, she slapped Chris and threw him out of his wheelchair.

The following summer, Rachel went into labor prematurely not long after discovering that her stepfather Joe Sugden (Frazer Hines) had died. She gave birth to a baby boy named "Joseph Mark" after her stepfather and brother. Chris helped Rachel raise their son and the pair started to fall out with Frank over his interference with Joseph. Later on 7 December 1995, Chris and Rachel got married – though Joe's brother Jack Sugden (Clive Hornby) and his wife Sarah (Alyson Spiro) were the only attendees due to Frank's refusal to attend the ceremony. However, the marriage lasted less than a year after Chris reverts to his position in Frank's business to the point where he becomes just as money-ambitious as his father himself – much to Rachel's disapproval. They soon divorce after Chris indirectly causes Rachel to undergo financial problems and the pair end up squabbling over their rights to Joseph.

By then, Chris has become archenemies with his stepmother Kim ever since the Plane Crash aftermath. This continues to the stage where Frank divorces Kim after her affair with Kathy's new fiancé, Dave Glover (Ian Kelsey), is exposed. Dave soon dies after rescuing Kim's infant son James from a fire at Home Farm on Christmas 1996. In the new year, Kim loses everything when Frank is revealed to be James' father – not Dave as she had hoped – and she soon leaves the village under mysterious circumstances. When it later becomes apparent that Kim has died after her car and a body was identified to be her in the quarry, Chris relishes in her supposed death. However, he is left outraged when Frank gets arrested and imprisoned under the circumstances behind Kim's death. Chris also discovers that Kim has conned £350,000 in a business transaction between them and wishes he killed her for this.

In 1997, it is revealed that Kim is actually alive and had faked her death in order to get revenge on Frank by implicating him under the circumstances that his role behind her supposed disappearance has led to her death. She returns to the village to confront Frank and ultimately kills him after causing their argument to end with Frank having a fatal a heart attack; Kim watches Frank die without helping him. On the day of Frank's funeral, Chris and Zoe discover that Kim is alive. He speculates that she killed Frank and swears revenge on Kim for his death, especially when Kim later inherits everything in Frank's will. Their rivalry intensifies for a long period of time, even when it comes to the pair co-managing operations in both Frank's business in Tate Haulage and at Home Farm. Trouble emerges when Kim gets into a business partnership with a seemingly-legitimate aristocrat named Lord Alex Oakwell (Rupam Maxwell), who later turns out to be illegitimate when he causes the death of Zoe's best friend Linda Fowler (Tonicha Jeronimo) on the night Kim celebrates her engagement party with her would-be second husband Steve Marchant (Paul Opacic). Although Alex Oakwell is eventually killed for his actions a year later, thanks to Linda's brother Roy (Nicky Evans) seeking justice for his sister's murder, Linda's death has further instigated her family's resentment towards Chris over an earlier incident. A few months ago when Frank was still alive, Chris had sexually harassed Linda to the point where he tried to rape her one night. He later planned to have Linda and her husband Biff (Stuart Wade) evicted from the family house. However, when Linda's father Ned Glover (Johnny Leeze) learns about her ordeal, he furiously kidnaps Chris and attempts to kill him at the quarry – nearly doing so until Linda and Biff, along with her mother Jan (Roberta Kerr), talk him out of it.

In 1998, Chris is pleased to learn that Kim and Steve are planning to sell Home Farm due to their financial problems not long after the pair get married. He seeks the help from Alex Oakwell's former wife Tara Cockburn (Anna Brecon) in her partnership with the Tates to grant him ownership of Home Farm. This works successfully and Chris sends Kim and Steve packing as they move out of Home Farm. A few months later, Chris seeks his chance to get revenge on Kim for his father's death when both she and Steve end up facing a potential prison stint for stealing a horse from their business rival – which as a result got Kathy hospitalized. Steve was convicted to a 12-year prison sentence while Kim is set to face the same fate once her bail concludes. That night, Chris lures Kim into Home Farm for a confrontation as he attempts to bring Kim to justice for killing his father. When Chris tried to blackmail her into giving him custody of James, she hit Chris over the head and tipped him out of his wheelchair. Kim then confessed to Chris that she had watched his father die, before pouring whisky over him and then escaping the village with James by helicopter. This was the last time Kim and Chris ever crossed paths.

In 1999, Chris hires his lawyer Laura Johnstone (Louise Beattie) to help manage the events of his company's business operations. At one stage she helps him reclaim Home Farm from the attempted usurpation of ownership from illegitimate conman Eric Pollard (Chris Chittell) and his old lover Stella Jones (Stephanie Schonfield). Soon enough, Chris ends up alienating most of the village and motives are eventually questioned when he later goes missing. Unbeknownst to the villagers, Chris has been kidnapped and is held hostage by his recently new hires employee named Liam Hammond. The kidnapping lasts for a few months, during which Liam reveals himself to be Frank's long-lost son – thus making him Chris's half-brother. Chris gradually forms a bond with Liam and was upset when he was shot dead by Zoe after she got caught up in the same situation. That same year, Chris is distraught to learn that Rachel has died despite getting custody of Joseph in the process; it later transpires that Rachel was murdered by her former boyfriend Graham Clark (Kevin Pallister), who previously killed his old spouse before proceeding to embark on a relationship with Kathy – only for his crimes to be exposed before Graham eventually kills himself. Chris helps Kathy nurse through her ordeal with Graham.

In 2000, Chris faces another major crisis when one of his lorry trucks ends up colliding onto a village bus – thus causing a devastating road collusion which leaves Kathy among several other residents critically injured. Kathy survives along with some residents, but four people end up being killed in the resulting Bus Crash – including local resident Butch Dingle (Paul Loughran and one of Chris' drivers named Pete. Despite the tragic circumstances in the Bus Crash, Chris opts to keep his business afloat even if it that means resorting to claiming negligence for his company's role in the accident. This is quickly opposed by Kathy and Zoe along with Chris' business partner Sean Reynolds (Stephen McGann). However, despite facing the potential of public backlash for thus, Chris adamantly stands by his decision – which in doing so instigates his feud with Butch's cousin and the village's would-be hardman, Cain Dingle (Jeff Hordley). Their conflict first emerges after Chris causes disruption in a press statement regarding the accident, when he orders two of his henchman to target Butch's stepmother Lisa (Jane Cox) after she admits to her involvement in the Bus Crash. In response, Cain punches Chris in front of everyone.

In 2001, Chris embarks on a relationship with Cain's other cousin Charity Dingle (Emma Atkins) – a former prostitutes – and they soon plan on getting married towards the end of the year. However, Zoe appears to dislike Charity and later tells her it was because of her history. Soon enough, though Zoe begins to fancy Charity herself and even offered her money to leave Chris. Tensions continue to rise between them when Charity responds by kissing her. Eventually, the pair begin a lesbian affair that would last for several months behind Chris' back. Charity became alarmed by Zoe's obsessive behaviour and tried to end the fling, but Zoe secretly recorded Charity confessing to the affair on tape and blackmailed her into signing a prenuptial agreement – so she would always have a hold over her. Charity then confessed all to Chris, and he surprised her by forgiving her and ripping up the prenup. The pair later got married despite opposition from both Cain and Zoe, while Cain's father and Lisa's husband Zak (Steve Halliwell) reluctantly accepts this – though not before he warns Chris about the consequences should he mess Charity about.

In 2002, Chris continues to dismiss Zoe's forgiveness for complicating things in his relationship with Charity. This soon changes, though, when Zoe ends up exhibiting signs of unstable behaviour and mental issues that culminates in her setting fire to the local church. Despite being rescued from the fire, Zoe gets sectioned in the process after being diagnosed with Schizophrenia. Chris supports Zoe through her ordeal and forgives her.

In 2003, Chris is shocked when Zoe gets pregnant and gives birth to a baby girl – whom she names Jean (Megan Pearson) in honor and Chris' late mother. He is later appalled to learn that Jean's father is wayward bad boy Scott Windsor (Ben Freeman) and furiously accuses him of raping Zoe due to her being a lesbian as well as the pair having a fling whilst she was undergoing issues with her condition. Wanting revenge, Chris begins a hate campaign against Scott. This involves Chris evicting Scott and his friends from his house, having his garage vandalized, increasing Scott's rent, and arranging for Scott's garage to be torched in an arson attack. Later on, he bribes a prostitute named Yolanda Howie (Charlotte Faber-Scott) to date Scott and then implicate him under false rape charges. This works successfully until Zoe eventually learns the extent of Chris' vendetta and, also discovering Scott never raped anyone to begin with, pays Yolanda to drop the charges.

By then, Chris' marriage has grown complicated and his feud with Cain has intensified. This is due to the revelation that Charity had a baby when she was 13 and given it up adoption, after a preteen schoolgirl named Debbie jones (Charley Webb) arrives in the village and claims that Debbie is her daughter. Not only is this true, but Debbie's father is revealed to Cain as well – even though Debbie had been earlier adopted by Butch's wife Emily (Kate McGregor) and her new husband Paddy Kirk (Dominic Brunt) as the child's foster parents. When Chris learns about this, he grows increasingly paranoid with the thought that Charity would cheat on him with Cain and that their parenthood of Debbie would complicate things in the process. Chris soon orders his right-hand man Terry Woods (Billy Hartman) to spy on them. At first Terry realizes Chris' paranoia is getting out of hand, but this later turns up to be true when the pair end up catching Charity giving Cain a passionate kiss.

Chris' reaction to Charity's affair with Cain is partly sidetracked when his paranoia behaviour evokes a starting discovery – that he has an inoperable brain tumor and only months to live. Chris later admits this to Zoe when she learns of Charity's betrayal, before requesting that neither she or Terry inform anyone about this. At the same time, Chris throws Charity out of Home Farm and plans to divorce her. He soon begins frittering away all his money to ensure Charity would be left with nothing. When his condition deteriorates, Chris plans to settle his score with Charity once and for all by inviting her to Home Farm for a chat. As he prepares himself for this, Chris bids a tearful goodbye to Zoe and Joseph before thanking Terry for standing by him at all costs. When Charity arrives, she desperately seeks to rebuild their marriage – but Chris makes it clear that he will never forgive her for cheating on him with Cain and proposes a morbid toast, to "The Death of their Marriage". When Chris drinks his champagne, he suddenly collapses onto the floor and dies in the same spot where his father had died six years previously; his last words to Charity was 'whore'.

Following Chris' death, Charity discovers his brain tumor before she ends up getting arrested on suspicion of his murder – as Chris had in fact poisoned his own drink in order to frame Charity for his death as revenge for her affair with Cain. In 2004, Charity is trialed for Chris' death and Zoe is determined to get her sent down for it. This initially becomes the case when Charity is found guilty and sentenced to life imprisonment for Chris' death. Later on, Charity gives birth to a baby boy in prison and names the infant Noah (Alfie Mortimer); she soon alerts Zoe about this and urges her to do a DNA test, which soon confirms Noah's father to be Chris. Thereafter Charity forces Zoe to have her released from prison and drops the charges in exchange for selling her rights of Noah to Zoe. In doing so, Zoe has Charity released from prison.

Over a decade later in 2017, Chris' now-adulted son Joe (now Ned Porteous) appears in the village – first appearing to be a successful entrepreneur named "Tom Waterhouse" who begins dating Debbie. In 2018, he reveals his identity to Debbie when it transpires that he is seeking revenge against Charity for his father's death. A few days later, Charity tells Noah (now Jack Downham) the truth of how Chris died and that he framed her for murder. A few months later, Kim returns to the village and is revealed to be the mastermind behind Joe's revenge against the Dingles. She mentions Chris on several occasions to the Dingles along with her third husband Graham Foster (Andrew Scarborough), who has earlier been transpired to have helped raise Joseph ever since he partnered up with Zoe years after Chris' death.

Reception
Chris' on-screen death on 18 September 2003 was watched by 10.25 million viewers. The character was nominated for Best Villain at the 2004 British Soap Awards. In 2014, Huffington Post UK named Chris as one of the 15 soap opera villains "we love to hate the most". He came in third in CBS Drama's 2018 list of the Top 5 Soap Opera Villains, with the author noting that: "Chris was originally a decent chap but after a plane crash rendered him paralysed from waist down he turned into a bitter person and even in his dying breaths whilst committing suicide he framed his wife for murder."

See also
List of soap opera villains

References

General references

External links
 Character profile at itv.com

Emmerdale characters
Fictional businesspeople
Fictional characters with cancer
Fictional characters with disabilities
Fictional characters with paraplegia
Fictional suicides
Male characters in television
Male villains
Television characters introduced in 1989